Bindiya Chamkegi is a 1984 Indian hindi film directed by Tarun Dutt, son of the veteran actor & director Guru Dutt. It stars Vinod Mehra, Rekha in lead roles, along with Amjad Khan, Johnny Walker in supporting roles. The music was composed by R. D. Burman.

Plot
Shalini 'Shalu' lives a wealthy lifestyle with her businessman brother, Shyam Kapoor, and is expected to marry Surajbhan, the son of wealthy Thakursaheb. She would prefer that Shyam got married first so that he can have someone to look after him, but as he was in love with a woman named Maya, who betrayed him, and since then is a heavy drinker, and hates women. When he fails to convince Shalu to marry, he marries a woman named Bindiya and brings her home with him. A thrilled Shalu approves the marriage, and also announces that she would like to give a formal reception for her brother's marriage.

The reception does take place, but Thakursaheb subsequently informs Shyam that Surajbhan has already married a woman of his choice. Shyam asks his friend, Ranjeet, and both arrange for Shalu's marriage to Daulatram's son, however, Bindiya does not approve of him, so Shalu rejects him. What Shalu does not know is that Shyam is actually single, but has hired Bindiya to act as his wife; and what Shyam does not know is that Ranjeet is not who he claims to be, but someone who seeks vengeance on Shyam.

Cast
 Vinod Mehra as Shyam Kapoor
 Rekha as Radha / Bindiya
 Amjad Khan as Inspector Vijay Kumar
 Johnny Walker as Rahim

Soundtrack
Lyricist: Anjaan

External links 
 

1980s Hindi-language films
1984 films
Films scored by R. D. Burman